The following is a chronological list of notable Japanese architects.

Pre Meiji period, Meiji period (1868–1911), Taishō Period (1912–1925), Shōwa Period (1926–1945)

Post World War II

See also 

 Architecture of Japan
 List of architects, List of landscape architects
 List of Japanese people

Japan
Architects